Sun compass may mean:

 Sun compass in animals, the innate ability of some animals to orientate themselves by the sun
 Solar compass, a 19th-century surveying instrument that made use of the sun's direction